Romuald Guarna (between 1110 and 1120 – 1 April 1181/2) was the  Archbishop of Salerno (as Romuald II)   from 1153 to his death. He is remembered primarily for his Chronicon sive Annales, an important historical record of his time.

Life 

Romuald was a native of Salerno, born into the old Lombard nobility. He studied as a youth in the Schola Medica Salernitana, where he studied not only medicine (in which he taught Gilles de Corbeil), but history, law, and theology. Romuald was raised to the Salernitan archbishopric after the death of William of Ravenna.

Romuald was a diplomat for the kings William I and William II. He negotiated the Treaty of Benevento of 1156 and signed the Treaty of Venice in 1177. Though he took part in the conspiracy against the Admiral Maio of Bari, he never fell out of favour and even performed the coronation of William II. Despite this, he exaggerates his own importance in his chronicle, which characteristically begins at creation and extends till 1178.

In 1160-1161, Romuald defended the city from the enraged William I, who was avenging the assassination of Maio. With the help of Salernitans at court and their connections to the king's intimates, the city was spared. In 1167, as the highest-ranking prelate in the realm, he crowned William II as king in the Cathedral of Palermo.

In 1179, Romuald intervened in a council condemning the Albigensians. He was succeeded by Nicholas of Ajello.

Chronicon sive Annales 

Romuald's work at a chronicle known as Chronicon was obviously connected with his studies at the Schola Salernitanae where his family had been involved over generations. It was part of a universal history and editions of the 19th century usually started with one paragraph before the last part called "Historia Normannorum, pars Sicula" (about the Norman kingdom of Sicily). According to Massino Oldoni the preceding compilation already existed, when Romuald was a child, the earlier Norman history also does not use the third person like the portion ascribed to him.

Editions

Notes

References
Alio, Jacqueline. Margaret, Queen of Sicily. New York: Trinacria, 2017, pp. 387-398 (translation of excerpts from Romuald's chronicle).
Matthew, D. J. A. "The Chronicle of Romuald of Salerno". The Writing of History in the Middle Ages: Essays presented to Richard William Southern. R. H. C. Davis and J. M. Wallace-Hadrill, edd. Oxford: 1981. 
Norwich, John Julius. The Kingdom in the Sun 1130-1194. London: Longman, 1970.

External links
 Romuald Guarna (biographical notes)

12th-century births
1180s deaths
People from Salerno
12th-century Italian historians
Italian chroniclers
12th-century Lombard people
12th-century Italian Roman Catholic archbishops
Archbishops of Salerno
Schola Medica Salernitana
12th-century Italian writers
12th-century Italian physicians
12th-century Latin writers